Susan Winchester was elected to the Oklahoma House of Representatives to represent District 47 in 1998 where she served until 2008. She was elected Whip for the Republican Caucus after her first term, and in 2005 became the first woman to serve as Speaker Pro Tempore, the second highest position in the House.

Biography
Susan Winchester, born in Chickasha, Oklahoma, earned her bachelor's and master's degrees at the University of Oklahoma. Winchester co-owned and operated American Dusting Company and Chickasha Flying Service from 1976 to 1989, after which she worked as a coordinator for Adult Training and Development at Canadian Valley Technology Center. In 1992 she started Winchester Group, an educational group that provides training and consulting to businesses.

Political career
Winchester was elected to the Oklahoma House of Representatives in 1998 and served until 2008. During her time in office, she served as Chair of the Banking Subcommittee of the Economic Development and Financial Services Committee. In 2005 Winchester became the first female and only the second Republican to serve as Speaker Pro Tempore, the second highest position in the House, since statehood.

In 2003 Winchester was chosen as Legislator of the Year by the Oklahoma Economic Development Council, Independent Insurance Agents of Oklahoma and Community Action Councils of Oklahoma. In 2002 she was inducted into the Oklahoma Institute of Child Advocacy's Hall of Fame.

Winchester currently resides in Chickasha, Oklahoma with her husband, Oklahoma Supreme Court Justice James R. Winchester, and their son.

Community Involvement
Winchester is widely involved in a number of organizations, including:
Leadership Oklahoma Class IX
Oklahoma City National Memorial Board
Memorial Institute for Prevention of Terrorism Board
Oklahoma Fit Kids Coalition Board
Oklahoma Academy for State Goals Board
Leadership Chickasha
Chickasha Chamber of Commerce
Tuttle Chamber of Commerce
Grady County Economic Development Council
Oklahoma Foundation for Excellence Selection Committee
University of Science and Arts of Oklahoma Board
American Legislative Exchange Council
Mustang Chamber of Commerce
President of the Oklahoma Judicial Auxiliary Conference

Awards and Achievements
Winchester has been recognized for her achievements with numerous awards, including:
Pathfinder Award given by the Research Institute for Economic Development (2002, 2005, 2006)
Journal Record 2006 Women of the Year
Kate Barnard Award given by the Oklahoma Association of Youth Services
Citizen's Recognition Award given by the Oklahoma Library Association
Legislator of the Year (Awarded by several groups)
Inducted into the Oklahoma Institute for Child Advocacy Hall of Fame (2002)

References

Further reading

Women of the Oklahoma Legislature Oral History Project -- OSU Library

Living people
Republican Party members of the Oklahoma House of Representatives
University of Oklahoma alumni
Businesspeople from Oklahoma
Women state legislators in Oklahoma
Year of birth missing (living people)
21st-century American politicians
21st-century American women politicians
People from Chickasha, Oklahoma